Ekaterina Ivanovna Zgurskaya (1915-2000) was a Soviet-Ukrainian Politician (Communist).

She served as Minister of Justice in 1957–1963.

References

1915 births
20th-century Ukrainian women politicians
Soviet women in politics
Ukrainian communists
Women government ministers of Ukraine
2000 deaths